The Camp may refer to:

Geography
The Camp, Gloucestershire, a village in Gloucestershire, United Kingdom
The Camp, an area of St Albans, Hertfordshire, United Kingdom
The Camp, California, a former name of Greenwater, California

Other uses
The Camp (film), a 2013 documentary film
The Camp (play), a 1778 play by Richard Brinsley Sheridan
"The Camp" (The Outer Limits), season 3 episode 7 of The Outer Limits
The Camp (Naturism), the first naturist club to be established in the United Kingdom

See also
 Camp (disambiguation)